Erik Raeburn (born June 19, 1971) is an American football coach.  He is the head football coach at Gannon University in Erie, Pennsylvania, a position he has held since November 2019.  Raeburn served as head football coach Coe College in Cedar Rapids, Iowa from 2000 to 2007, Wabash College in Crawfordsville, Indiana from 2008 to 2015, and Savannah State University in Savannah, Georgia from 2016 to 2018. He is the nephew of former Mount Union football head coach Larry Kehres.

Coaching career
Raeburn was the head football coach at Coe College in Cedar Rapids, Iowa from 2000 to 2007.  His teams compiled a 57–26 record and won the Iowa Intercollegiate Athletic Conference championship three times. On February 2, 2008, Raeburn was named the 32nd head coach at Wabash College in Crawfordsville, Indiana.  He served as the head football coach at Wabash from 2008 to 2015.  

Raeburn was the head football coach at Savannah State University in Savannah, Georgia from March 28, 2016 until December 7, 2018, when he was relieved of his duties by school's interim athletic director, Opio Mashariki. Raeburn was the 25th head football coach in history of the Savannah State program.

Head coaching record

References

External links
 Gannon profile
 Savannah State profile

1971 births
Living people
Coe Kohawks football coaches
Gannon Golden Knights football coaches
Mount Union Purple Raiders football coaches
Mount Union Purple Raiders football players
Savannah State Tigers football coaches
Wabash Little Giants football coaches